The Layou River is a river in Dominica. It rises in the interior of the country, flowing westward to reach the Caribbean Sea on the country's central western coast, very close to the town of St. Joseph. It is the longest and deepest river in Dominica.

Disaster 
The river is prone to flooding. Matthieu Dam which is located near the end of the river has collapsed multiple times. It all started in the year 1997 when landslides, due to heavy rainfall blocked portions of the river. In the year 2011, the river flooded twice. It flooded in July 2011 and more recently in October 2011.  This poses a major threat to the Layou village. There were no deaths, but it affected 13 dwellings.

References

External links

Rivers of Dominica